All Hour Cymbals is the debut studio album by Brooklyn-based experimental rock group Yeasayer.  It was released by We Are Free on 23 October 2007, and 24 March 2008 in the UK.

Reception 

All Hour Cymbals received positive reviews from publications and websites such as Entertainment Weekly, NME, Pitchfork, and Spin. Pitchfork placed it at number 197 on their list of top 200 albums of the 2000s.

As of 2012, sales in the United States have exceeded 55,000 copies, according to Nielsen SoundScan.

Track listing

Notes 

Yeasayer albums
2007 debut albums